Sir Digvijaysinhji Ranjitsinhji Jadeja  (18 September 1895 – 3 February 1966) was the Maharaja Jam Sahib of Nawanagar from 1933 to 1966, succeeding his uncle, the famed cricketer Ranjitsinhji.

Early life and military career

Ranjitsinhji, a Chandravanshi Rajput, was born at Sadodar, Gujarat on 18 September 1895 during the British Raj, nephew of the famed cricketer K.S. Ranjitsinhji. He was educated at The Rajkumar College, Rajkot, in Saurashtra, then at Malvern College and University College London.

Commissioned as second lieutenant in the British Army in 1919, Digvijaysinhji enjoyed a military career for over two decades. Attached to the 125th Napier's Rifles (now 5th Battalion (Napier's), The Rajputana Rifles) in 1920, he served with the Egyptian Expeditionary Force, subsequently receiving a promotion to Lieutenant in 1921. He then served with the Waziristan Field Force from 1922 to 1924; after a promotion to captain in 1929, he retired from the army in 1931. However, he would continue to receive honorary promotions in the Indian Army until 1947, ending with the rank of lieutenant-general.

Two years later, Digvijaysinhji succeeded his uncle, who had adopted him as his heir. From 1939 until his demise, he was the longest serving President of Governing Council of The Rajkumar College, Rajkot.

Maharaja Jam Sahib

Upon the passing of his uncle, Digvijaysinhji became Maharaja Jam Sahib in 1933, continuing his uncle's policies of development and public service. Knighted in 1935, Sir Digvijaysinhji joined the Chamber of Princes, leading it as president from 1937 to 1943. Upholding the cricketing tradition of his uncle, he served as President of the Board of Control for Cricket in India in 1937–1938 and was a member of several prominent sporting clubs. He had previously played a single first-class match during the 1933–34 season, captaining Western India against the MCC during its tour of India and Ceylon. He scored 0 and 6 in his two innings, in what was also the only first-class match played by his brother, Pratapsinhji. During the Second World War, Sir Digvijaysinhji served on the Imperial War Cabinet and the National Defence Council, along with the Pacific War Council.

Polish refugees

In 1942, he established the Polish Children's Camp in Jamnagar-Balachadi for refugee Polish children who were brought out of the USSR during World War II.  

It existed until 1945, when it was closed and the children were transferred to Valivade, a quarter of the city of Kolhapur. The camp site today is part of 300 acre campus of the Sainik School, Balachadi.
The Jamsaheb Digvijaysinh Jadeja School in Warsaw was established to honour this legacy. In 2016, 50 years after Jam Saheb's death, Poland's Parliament unanimously adopted a special resolution honouring Jam Saheb Digvijay Sinhji for his aid to Polish children refugees during World War II.

A documentary titled "Little Poland in India" was made in collaboration of both Indian and Polish governments to honour the efforts of Maharaja Jam Sahib and Kira Banasinska, who led the movement in India to rehabilitate Polish refugees. 
After independence of India, he signed the Instrument of Accession to the Dominion of India on 15 August 1947. He merged Nawanagar into the United State of Kathiawar the following year, serving as its Rajpramukh until the Government of India abolished the post in 1956.

Representative at international organisations

Divijaysinhji represented India as a delegate at the first session of the League of Nations in 1920. He was also the Deputy Leader of the Indian delegation to the UN, and chaired both the UN Administration Tribunal and the UN Negotiating Committee on Korean Rehabilitation following the Korean War.

Personal life

On 7 March 1935 at Sirohi, Sir Digvijaysinhji married Maharajkumari Baiji Raj Shri Kanchan Kunverba Sahiba (1910–1994), second daughter of Maharajadhiraj Maharao Sri Sir Sarup Ram Singhji Bahadur, the Maharao of Sirohi. She took the name of Her Highness Deoriji Maharani Shri Gulab Kunverba Sahiba, and the couple had one son and three daughters.

Death

After a reign of 33 years, Sir Digvijaysinhji died in Bombay on 3 February 1966, aged 70. He was succeeded by his only son, Shatrusalyasinhji, who was a first-class cricketer for Saurashtra.

Honours

(ribbon bar, as it would look today)

India General Service Medal w/ Wazirstan Clasp-1924
King George V Silver Jubilee Medal-1935
King George VI Coronation Medal-1937
Knight Grand Commander of the Order of the Indian Empire (GCIE)-1939
1939-1945 Star-1945
Africa Star-1945
Pacific Star-1945
War Medal 1939-1945-1945
Knight Grand Commander of the Order of the Star of India (GCSI)-1947 (KCSI-1935)
India Service Medal-1945
Indian Independence Medal-1947
Commander's Cross of the Order of Merit of the Republic of Poland (posthumous) – 2011

In popular culture

The upcoming Indo-Polish war epic film The Good Maharaja (2022) is going to depict Digvijaysinhji Ranjitsinhji Jadeja.

See also 

 India–Poland relations

Notes

External links

The Maharaja Who Saved Hundreds of Polish Orphans
The Good Maharaja: The Ambassador to rescue of Polish children
A Maharaja in Warsaw

1895 births
1966 deaths
Indian cricketers
Western India cricketers
British Indian Army officers
Knights Grand Commander of the Order of the Star of India
People educated at Malvern College
Alumni of University College London
Gujarati people
People from Gujarat
Maharajas of Nawanagar
Cricketers from Gujarat
Indian knights
Indian royalty
Knights Commander of the Order of the Indian Empire
Commanders of the Order of Merit of the Republic of Poland
Rajpramukhs
Presidents of the Board of Control for Cricket in India
Polish refugees
India–Poland relations
Polish expatriates in India
Refugees in India